Thomas Walton Mellor (3 October 1814 – 17 February 1902) was a British cotton manufacturer and Conservative politician.

Early years
Thomas was the third son of Thomas Mellor of Ashton-under-Lyne, Lancashire, and his wife Mary Walton of Stalybridge, Cheshire. He was christened on 30 October 1814 at the parish church of St Michael Ashton-under-Lyne.

Career
He became a major "cotton master" in Ashton, and led the opposition to the costs of the town obtaining a charter of incorporation as a municipal borough in 1847. He was a magistrate for the borough of Ashton and the counties palatine of Chester and Lancaster.

In 1868 Mellor was elected as Member of Parliament for Ashton-under-Lyne, describing himself as "a Conservative with Liberal tendencies". He stood down from parliament in 1880.

Family life
He married Jane Leigh of Compsall Bridge in 1849 and they had a son, John Edward.

Death
Mellor died at Ashton-under-Lyne 17 February 1902.

References

External links 
 

1814 births
Conservative Party (UK) MPs for English constituencies
UK MPs 1868–1874
UK MPs 1874–1880
1902 deaths
Members of the Parliament of the United Kingdom for Ashton-under-Lyne